Home Along Da Riles ( or 'Home Along the Railroad''') is a Philippine situational comedy series that aired on the Philippine television network ABS-CBN from December 23, 1992 to August 10, 2003, and was replaced by Ang Tanging Ina. The title started out as a play on the feature film Home Alone and with the main character's first name taken as a direct copy from the film's protagonist and his last name a pun of American actor Kevin Costner's last name.

This series is currently streaming on Kapamilya Online Live Global every Wednesdays, 3:00 am-5:00 am.

Premise

The series tells the lives of the Cosme family and neighbors who live in the nearby railroad tracks. The family patriarch, Kevin Kosme, serves as the breadwinner of the family. He deals with problems with his five children, long-time love interest Aling Ason, brothers-in-law Richy and Elvis, and the people from the agency he worked at including the antagonistic Steve. Aside from the problems, there are some non-sense exploits and misadventures that would laugh your butts off.

Cast and characters
Main cast
Dolphy as Mang Kevin Kosme - A messenger/janitor in a placement agency who hopes to be sent overseas someday as a cook. He is a hard-working, helpful, friendly, kind, widower with five children.
Nova Villa as Corazon "Aling Ason" Madamba - Mang Kevin's love interest who is working in the real estate industry. Over the course of the series, it is revealed that Kevin and Ason were once lovers who hoped to get married someday, but Kevin eloped with her twin sister Asuncion (also known as Sion) and married her instead. Despite their past, Aling Ason spares no opportunity to proclaim her love for Kevin and also looks after his children.
Bernardo Bernardo as Steve Carpio (Antagonist) - An assistant at the Lagdameo Placement Agency, Steve is also Hilary's cousin and enjoys putting Mang Kevin down.
Smokey Manaloto as Bill Kosme - The eldest of Mang Kevin's four biological children, Bill is a working student in college, taking up commerce. He is depicted in the series as a handsome man with a long string of failed courtships. He eventually ended up with Trisha (Rica Peralejo) at the end of the series.
Cita Astals as Hilary Lagdameo - Mang Kevin's boss at the Lagdameo Placement Agency, Hilary is very understanding of him.
Claudine Barretto (1992–1997, as guest 1997–2003) as Bing Kosme - Mang Kevin's only daughter, Bing is a pretty and smart high school senior who attracts many suitors. She moved out of the house upon entering college and went to the U.S. with the help of paternal aunt Matilda Kosme (Celia Rodriguez). The latter was a plot hook inserted as Barretto left the show from 1998 to 1999 due to other showbiz commitments. 
Gio Alvarez as Bob Kosme - The second in the Kosme brood, Bob is a mass communication freshman in college, who also plans to work in a band to augment the family's income. However, he and his friends always get into trouble.  He got married early to his classmate Lorie.
Maybelyn dela Cruz as Maybe Madamba - Aling Ason's adopted daughter who is also Baldo and Estong's playmate.
Boy 2 Quizon as Estong Kosme - Mang Kevin's only adopted child, Estong is the son of Aling Asón's laundrywoman who died and passed down to Mang Kevin the responsibility of taking care of him.
Vandolph Quizon as Baldomero "Baldo" Kosme - Mang Kevin's youngest son, Baldo loves to play and eat and he is spoiled by Aling Ason despite getting low grades in school.
Babalu (1994–1998) as Richy - One of Aling Ason's two half-brothers, Richy is greedy and determined to claim the land where Aling Ason and Mang  Kevin live, insisting on his rights to the property. He makes a living as a pedicab driver claiming that it belongs to him. He is also a gluttonous man and likes to eat the food served by his half-sister or half-brother-in-law.
Carding Castro (1998–2003) as Elvis - The second of Aling Ason's two half-brothers, Elvis is just as greedy as Richy and owns Richy's pedicab. He replaced the character Richy after Babalu's death in 1998.
Victoria Haynes (1998–2000) as Terya - Richy's energetic daughter that comedically and cluelessly foils Richy (and later on Elvis's) get rich quick schemes. Introduced to the sitcom in the fourth season, she surprises the cast by claiming to be Richy's unknown daughter that even he did not know about. She grew up in the province with her wealthy mother played by Kris Aquino in flashbacks.
Paula Peralejo as Bessie Kosme - One of Mang Kevin's two nieces, Bessie was introduced to the show during Bing's temporary absence as a young teenager studying in Manila.
Nikki Valdez as Becky Kosme - The second of Mang Kevin's two nieces.
Aurora Halili as Lorie Kósme - Bob Kosme's wife.
Ces Quesada as Bridge - Bob's domineering mother-in-law.
Rica Peralejo as Trisha - Bill Kosme's long-time girlfriend.

Supporting
Dang Cruz as Roxanne - Aling Ason's household helper, Roxanne, she provides comic relief on the show.
Sherilyn Reyes, Joymee Lim and Erica Fife as Mang Kevin Kosme's officemates. 
Anjanette Abayari
Lara Morena
Noel Trinidad
Daniel Pasia
Marivic Martin
AJ Hipolito
Tommy Angeles (1992-2000) as Mang Tomas - Owner of a sari-sari store right outside the Kósme residence, and one of Mang Kevin's closest friends.
Maureen Guese as Maureen - Richy's daughter.
John Amos Tan as Moymoy
Vhong Navarro as Hercules
Dinky Doo Jr. as Simeon 
Angela Velez
Bentot Jr. as Budoy
Miaflor as Darling
Leo Gamboa as Totoy Buko - Storekeeper of a sari-sari store who takes over Tomas. He replaced the character Tomas after the untimely health confinement of Tommy Angeles until his death in 2000.
Alvin Espino as Boy Pepe
Niño Virinia as Boy Tulis
Clay Marco Jr. as Boy Salida
Quinne Incoy as Boy Masid
Scotts Marlo Quirante as Don Quirante
Ramon Abon Jr. as Botlog Yosi - Sunog Baga!
Angeli Gonzales as ABK - Bob and Lorie's Daughter
Dennis Padilla  as Paktol - Mang Kevin's Nemesis at Work.
Kitty Manalo, Danny Hernandez, Joel Cruz, Presley de la Cruz, Rudy de la Cruz, William Ganadores and Caloy Alde as members of Riles Boys or the Sunog-Baga. They are Kosme's neighbors, representative of Filipino tambays.

Films

Star Cinema made two movies in junction to the series: Home Along Da Riles (1993) and Home Along Da Riles Part 2 (1997).

The first movie (1993) goes deeper into Kevin's history revealing he was an all-star chef at a hotel but was fired after an explosion in the hotel's kitchen, ending up with him working as a messenger in a placement agency thereafter. The family was also implicated from trying to expose corrupt practices of a corrupt politician to the Presidential Anti-Crime Task Force, which nearly cost their lives.

The second movie (1997) follows Kevin and his family after he "inherits" a family estate from his late uncle. While at the family estate, the family solves the real problem of why a business tycoon was trying to seize its inheritance, which the tycoon also owns and operates the polluted factory near the estates' land.

In 2014, the first film was digitally restored into HD and was to be released via Kapamilya Blockbusters.

Reception
Dolphy was able to separate all his notable characters that made him a wonderful actor. According to critics, Dolphy was able to turn his character Mang Kevin Cosme into a unique kind of father that Filipinos adore, and his characters as Facifica Falayfay, Fefita Fofonggay, Omeng Satanasia and John Purontong into other timeless characters that has made a mark in people's minds. Until he was old and ailing, Dolphy had been making movies like Father Jejemon.

TimeslotHome Along Da Riles aired on Wednesday nights from 1992-1995. In 1995, the show was transferred to Thursday nights. The network shifted its timeslot to Monday nights on September 10 to October 15, 2001. It was finally transferred to Sunday evening from October 28, 2001 until its finale.

Spinoff
Serving as a sequel to the original sitcom, Home Along da Airport which was aired on ABS-CBN from August 16, 2003, to January 22, 2005, replacing Arriba, Arriba!. features Mang Kevin Kosme and his family's exploits after they decided to vacate their former home near the railroad tracks after being persuaded by the head of the Metropolitan Development Agency (played by Bayani Fernando as himself in the show's penultimate episode) due to safety concerns, eventually settling in a small community situated near the city airport. Despite having finished sending all of his children to school, Mang Kevin still continues with his job at the placement agency, while Aling Ason, with whom Mang'' Kevin shares his household, plies her new trade in the meat-selling business. In their new community the Kosmes are joined by their new neighbors, friends and acquaintances who bond over their common continuing problem—dealing with the regular jet noise from the airplanes taking off and landing from the nearby airport.

Cast
Dolphy as Mang Kevin Kósme
Nova Villa as Corazon "Aling Asón" Madamba
Smokey Manaloto as Bill Kósme
Claudine Barretto as Bing Kósme
Vandolph Quizon as Baldomero "Baldo" Kósme
Dennis Padilla as Paktol - Mang Kevin's Nemesis at Work
Long Mejia as Don Long
Aubrey Miles as J.Lo, a customer service agent at the airport
Camille Prats as Sam
Alyssa Gibbs as Sofi 
Rochelle Pangilinan as Olivia 
John Wayne Sace as Teddy Ver
Redford White as Gabriel
Palito as Michael
Dagul as Bobby

Awards and nominations

See also
List of programs broadcast by ABS-CBN
John en Marsha
Quizon Avenue

References

External links

1992 Philippine television series debuts
1993 films
2003 Philippine television series endings
1990s Philippine television series
ABS-CBN original programming
Filipino-language television shows
Philippine television sitcoms
Star Cinema films